The Hickeliinae are a subtribe of bamboo (tribe Bambuseae of the family Poaceae). It comprises nine genera.

References

Bambusoideae
Plant subtribes